The UK BiCon (more formally known as the UK National Bisexual Convention or UK National Bisexual Conference), is the largest and most consistent annual gathering of the United Kingdom's bisexual community.

While the format does vary, the typical format is a long weekend over four days consisting of workshops, discussions, meetings and social events. Although being billed as a "bisexual" event, it is open to partners of bisexuals, supporters, non-bisexuals, non-definers, and anyone else interested in issues relevant to bisexuals. To that extent it can often be characterised as a nexus of the sexual freedom and queer movements. Each BiCon event usually attracts between 200 and 400 people. The event frequently changes location between England, Scotland, and Wales, to promote accessibility.

History
In December 1984 the London Bisexual Group (in association with the now defunct zine Bi-Monthly) ran a conference called "The Politics of Bisexuality" at The Factory Community Project in Highbury. Around 40 people attended and judged the event to be a huge success. A second event was then attended by over fifty people in April 1985. Unfortunately the venue used, the London Lesbian and Gay Centre, had just decided to ban bisexuals (and some other groups) from their premises. This did not stop the conferences which soon gained popularity in a Britain devoid of bisexual-focused events.

That following October the Edinburgh Bisexual Group took up the torch and ran an event called "Bisexuality and the Politics of Sex". This established the idea of conferences moving around the nation. The next was run by a bisexual women's group in London.  By this point the community was starting to know what they wanted from BiCon – a chance to meet other bisexuals (and their allies) from across the country, discuss sexuality issues, relax in the company of like-minded folk and network.

Armed with an agreed purpose, for the next few years the conference alternated between venues in London and Edinburgh. Then in 1989 it branched out to Coventry. As well as being the first one outside the two capitals, it was also the first to be residential (previously, people from outside the host city had either booked accommodation privately or stayed with local attendees) and to use the name 'BiCon', in part because of the organisers' and venue's experience with SF Cons (Science Fiction conventions).

A range of cities and towns have hosted it since. Over time BiCon has evolved to fit with the needs of the community. The word 'conference' has been largely replaced by 'convention', but there is still a political and campaigning side to the event. In recent years the momentum behind the event has spawned a number of offshoots, such as BiFest, BabyBiCon, and the bi academic conference BiReCon, which have expanded on particular areas covered by BiCon.

In 2002 BiCon hosted the first Cake Awards recognising the breadth of contributions made to the bisexual community in the UK. Further Cake Awards have been presented at BiCon every few years since.

In the Netherlands, Holland BiCon was inspired by UK BiCon, and has run annually since 2009. BICON has been a registered trade mark of BiCon Continuity Ltd since 2016.

Past events

Future events

BabyBiCon
A spin-off event BabyBiCon aimed at bisexual youth (those under 26 years old) was held in Manchester on 5–7 June 1998. It was organised at the Ardwick Youth Club by the group BiYouth (which folded in 2000) with support from a couple of local lesbian and gay youth projects. While attracting around 25 people, discussions of holding successor events in 1999 and 2000 led to nothing.

BiReCon
BiReCon is a research conference for academic work on bisexuality. BiReCon originated as a series of workshops at BiCon. Elizabeth Barker-Williams came up with the name while on the organizing committee for the 2008 BiCon. 

The first BiReCon was organized as a national conference to be held before BiCon 2008. It was held in 2008 at the University of Leicester. There were approximately 60 attendees.

In 2010, BiCon (UK) organized the 10th International Conference on Bisexuality (ICB). The organizers decided to make the second BiReCon an international conference. It took place on 26 August 2010, the day before ICB, at the University of East London. Speakers included Serena Anderlini-D'Onofrio, Eric Anderson, Robyn Ochs, and John Sylla. There were approximately 100 attendees.

The third BiReCon took place on 9 August 2012 at Bradford University and focused on mental health. Speakers included Meg-John Barker, Roshan das Nair, and Christina Richards. The fourth BiReCon focused on joining academics research and community-run bi groups, and it was held on 31 July 2014 at Leeds Trinity University.

The fifth BiReCon, EuroBiReCon, was an international conference held on 28–29 July 2016 at the University of Amsterdam. The keynote speakers on the first day were Dr. Surya Monro and Dr. Alex Iantaffi. The second day included a workshop presented by Robyn Ochs, Meg-John Barker, and Maria Pallotta-Chiarolli.

See also
 BiFest

References

"BiCon UK: Archives" at Bicon.org.uk. Accessed 7 May 2011.
2 March 2002 - "BiCon's Past" at Bi.tocotox.org. Accessed 13 July 2005.
27 August 2010 - "National bisexual convention to include daily worship" at ekklesia.co.uk. Accessed 27 September 2010.
Pink News - Review: Bisexuality conferences tackle hate crime, censorship and Shakespeare Accessed 27 September 2010.
The Guardian - Bisexuals: putting the B back in LGBT Accessed 27 September 2010.
BiMedia.org - Britain's Biggest BiCon Ever! Accessed 27 September 2010.
World’s biggest Bi-sexual conference at ExCel now on Accessed 27 September 2010.
British Bisexuality: A Snapshot of Bisexual Representations and Identities in the United Kingdom - Meg Barker; Helen Bowes-Catton; Alessandra Iantaffi; Angela Cassidy; Laurence Brewer

External links
Official website
BiCon (UK) at Dreamwidth, including a mirror of the previous LiveJournal community
BiCon 2016
BiCon 2017
BiCon 2018

Bisexual events
Conventions in the United Kingdom
LGBT conferences
LGBT events in the United Kingdom
Bisexual organizations
Annual events in the United Kingdom